The Detroit Medical Center (DMC) is a for-profit alliance of hospitals that encompasses over 2,000 licensed beds, 3,000 affiliated physicians and over 12,000 employees. Located in Midtown Detroit, the DMC is affiliated with medical schools from Wayne State University and Michigan State University.  Detroit Medical Center hospitals are staffed by physicians from the Michigan State University College of Osteopathic Medicine and the Wayne State University School of Medicine, the largest single-campus medical school in the United States and the nation's fourth largest medical school overall. The Detroit Medical Center is fully accredited by the Joint Commission on Accreditation of Healthcare Organizations.

The Detroit Medical Center is the official healthcare services provider for the Detroit Tigers and the Detroit Red Wings.

On March 19, 2010, Vanguard Health Systems and Detroit Medical Center announced an $850 million expansion and renovation plan. Detroit Medical Center formally became a part of Vanguard Health Systems on December 30, 2010, as a for-profit corporation. Vanguard agreed to invest nearly $1.5 billion which included $417 million to retire debts, at least $350 million in capital expenditures and an additional $500 million for new capital investment in Detroit Medical Center. Vanguard has agreed to assume all debts and pension obligations.  In June 2013, rival Tenet Healthcare announced it would purchase Vanguard for $1.73 billion.  The transaction closed October 3, 2013.

History
The Detroit Medical Center was organized in 1985 as an affiliation among several hospitals: Harper University Hospital, Grace Hospital, Hutzel Women's Hospital, and Children's Hospital of Michigan.  With the addition of other hospitals, such as Detroit Receiving Hospital, the campus of the DMC and its adjacent partner institutions (the Karmanos Cancer Institute and the John D. Dingell VA Medical Center) now occupies most of the area bounded Mack Avenue on the south, Warren Avenue on the north, John R. on the west, and Beaubien on the east.

Harper Hospital was founded in 1863, receiving its first patients, Civil War soldiers, in 1864.  Two years later it opened as a general hospital.  In 1882, a new hospital building was constructed on what is now the campus of the DMC.  Additional buildings were constructed in 1913 and 1928.  Hutzel Women's Hospital, was founded in 1868. Grace Hospital was founded in 1883, and Children's Hospital was founded three years later. Detroit Receiving was founded in 1915, and moved to its present location in 1980.

Organization

The Detroit Medical Center is a part of Tenet Healthcare, a major health care provider. The Detroit Medical Center operates eight general and specialty hospitals in southeast Michigan. Detroit Medical Center hospitals include: 
DMC Children's Hospital of Michigan (Pediatric Level I trauma center)
DMC Detroit Receiving Hospital (Michigan's first Level I Trauma Center and first emergency medicine training program)
DMC Harper University Hospital (with specialty services including bariatric surgery, cardiology, vascular procedures, neurosurgery, neurology and kidney and pancreas organ transplants)
DMC Heart Hospital and Harper Specialty Center (Open August 2014)
DMC Huron Valley-Sinai Hospital (in adjacent Oakland County, Michigan)
DMC Hutzel Women's Hospital (obstetrics, infertility and gynecology)
DMC Surgery Hospital (surgical services)
DMC Rehabilitation Institute of Michigan (rehabilitation medicine and spinal cord injuries)
DMC Sinai-Grace Hospital (cardiology, heart and vascular procedures, neurosurgery, nephrology, orthopedics and total joint replacement surgery, trauma and emergency medicine, oncology, women's health services, gastrointestinal, cosmetic surgery, and many other specialties)
Partnerships
Kresge Eye Institute is part of Wayne State University that offers ophthalmology and cornea transplantation services.

Corporate governance 
Former Wayne County Prosecutor Mike Duggan was president and Chief Executive Officer from January 2004 through December 2012 when he left to mount a campaign to become mayor of Detroit.  Joseph Mullany succeeded Duggan as CEO.  Former WDIV journalist Emery King is contracted to serve as the voice commonly heard on DMC commercials, and presents the Emery King Healthcare Video Library at the Detroit Medical Center's website.

Recognition
Two of the Detroit Medical Center hospitals ranked in the top one percent in heart failure outcomes in the U.S. DMC Harper University Hospital and DMC Sinai-Grace Hospital ranked above the national average in a survey compiled by the Centers for Medicare and Medicaid Services (CMS) and the Department of Health and Human Services. The list included data from 4,807 hospitals across the United States. Of those hospitals, only 38 were ranked above the national average. The results are meant to assist the public in assessing how well their area hospitals care for patients with specific types of medical conditions including heart failure and heart attacks. The Detroit Medical Center is the only health system in the state of Michigan with two hospitals ranked at this level.

The Detroit Medical Center was named to the list of the nation's 100 Most Wired Hospitals and Health Systems in July 2007.  The list is the result of the Most Wired Survey and Benchmarking Study conducted since 1999 by the American Hospital Association and published in the July 2007 issue of Hospitals & Health Networks Magazine.  The survey focuses on how hospitals use information technologies for quality, customer service, public health and safety, business processes and workforce issues.

The hospitals in the "Top 100" show superior outcomes in four key areas: mortality rate, patient safety measures from the Agency for Healthcare Research and Quality (AHRQ), core measures from Hospital Compare and average length of stay.  Based on analysis of the ninth annual Most Wired Survey and Benchmarking Study results, hospitals are embracing technology as a key tool for healthcare quality improvements.

The Detroit Medical Center received the prestigious "Best Practices in Infrastructure Management" award in 2006.  The award is given annually by Computerworld’s Infrastructure Management World, the premier conference for leaders in the data center and infrastructure Management sector. The award recognizes DMC's leadership and excellence among users of infrastructure management technology across the nation.  The DMC was one of only two organizations bestowed the annual award that year.

Harper University Hospital ranked as one of the top 30 hospitals in the country for Neurology and Neurosurgery by U.S. News & World Report. Children's Hospital of Michigan was ranked one of the top 30 hospitals in the country for children by the same publication.

References

Further reading 
  - PhD thesis - Info page

External links

Detroit Medical Center−DMC Homepage
DMC Children's Hospital of Michigan Homepage
DMC Detroit Receiving Hospital Homepage
DMC Harper University Hospital Homepage
DMC Huron Valley-Sinai Hospital Homepage
DMC Hutzel Women's Hospital Homepage
DMC Kresge Eye Institute Homepage
DMC Surgery Hospital Homepage
DMC Rehabilitation Institute of Michigan Homepage
DMC Sinai-Grace Hospital Homepage
DMC University Laboratories Homepage
DMC Emery King Health Video Library
List of US Trauma Centers

 
Hospitals in Detroit
Teaching hospitals in Michigan
Midtown Detroit
Economy of Detroit
Healthcare in Michigan
Hospital networks in the United States
Tenet Healthcare
1985 establishments in Michigan